Chipchikovo (Sıpsıq) is a rural locality (a village) in Toshkurovsky Selsoviet, Baltachevsky District, Bashkortostan, Russia. The population was 16 as of 2010. There is 1 street.

Geography 
Chipchikovo is located 10 km northeast of Starobaltachevo (the district's administrative centre) by road. Mishcherovo is the nearest rural locality.

References 

Rural localities in Baltachevsky District